Chahzal (also Romanized as Chahzāl, Chazāl, and Chehzāl) is a village in Koregah-e Sharqi Rural District, in the Central District of Khorramabad County, Lorestan Province, Iran. At the 2006 census, its population was 230, in 47 families.

References 

Towns and villages in Khorramabad County